Maria Ilnicka, maiden name Majkowska (1825 or 1827 – 26 August 1897, Warsaw) was a Polish poet, novelist, translator and journalist. She took part in the January Uprising against Russia, serving as an archivist of Polish National Government. After the collapse of the uprising, for short time, she was imprisoned. Ilnicka was advocate of feminism and organic work. In 1865, she was leading redactor weekly magazine for woman “Bluszcz”.

In 1870-1890, at Warsaw she gives rise to salon literary. She was author of idyllic comedy, poem and novel. She also translated the work of Walter Scott and Johann Wolfgang von Goethe.

Works
Maids Konopianki (Panny Konopianki)
Name-day of good mother (Imieniny dobrej mamy)
Illustrated jewel-box of Poland – the rhyming history of Poland with music by Stanisław Moniuszko  (Ilustrowany skarbczyk Polski - rymowana historia Polski z muzyką Stanisława Moniuszki)

See also 

Positivism in Poland

1820s births

1897 deaths
Polish women novelists
Year of birth uncertain
19th-century Polish novelists
19th-century Polish poets
Writers from Warsaw
Polish feminists
Polish translators
Polish women poets
19th-century translators
19th-century Polish women writers
Translators of Johann Wolfgang von Goethe

Polish positivists